Amandin may refer to:

 Amandin (protein), a protein in plum and peach kernels
 Saint-Amandin, a commune in south-central France
 Amandin Rutayisire (born 1985), Rwandan basketball player

See also 
 Amandine (disambiguation)